Ilmet is a skyscraper in Warsaw, Poland. It was finished in 1997. In mid-2010s plans for its demolishing have been announced.
In March 2022 the building became one of humanitarian aid centers for Ukrainian refugees.

References

Skyscrapers in Warsaw
Wola

Buildings and structures completed in 1997